"Oh My God" (stylized in sentence case) is a song recorded by South Korean girl group (G)I-dle as the lead single for their third extended play I Trust. It was released in both Korean and English through Cube Entertainment on April 6, 2020. The song was composed by Soyeon and long-time collaborator Big Sancho, while the lyrics for the English version were translated by Lauren Kaori.

In South Korea, the song debuted and peaked at number 15 on the Gaon Digital Chart, and peaked at number 3 on the Billboard World Digital Songs chart. An accompanying music video, directed by Yoon Rima and Jang Dongju, was released alongside the single. It became (G)I-dle's third to reach 100 million views, after "Latata" and "Hann (Alone)", and was nominated for Best K-Pop Video at the 2020 MTV Video Music Awards. 

A Japanese version of the song was released on August 26, 2020, as the lead single from their 2nd Japanese EP Oh My God.

Background and composition
"Oh My God" was released in Korean and English language. According to Miyeon, they included the English version specially for global fans for the now-postponed I-Land: Who Am I Tour.
"Oh My God" was written and co-produced by leader Soyeon, who composed the group's popular songs from "Latata" to "Lion". Crystal Bell from MTV describes the song as "a dark, trap-infused song with lyrics that riff on contrasts — light and dark, purity and sin" and "It's not a typical pop chorus exploding with uptempo beats and bright melodies". It is composed in the key of E minor, with a tempo of 110 BPM running three minutes and fifteen seconds.

The song was conceptualized around the theme of 'self-trust' when encountering reality and experiencing feelings of rejection, confusion, recognition, and dignity. It is an urban hip hop track in which the stark differences in rhythm that correspond to the atmospheric changes within the song stand out. The fantasy-like mood and bold production are led by a vintage piano sound and strong 808 bass.

The specific lyrics "Oh my god / she took me to the sky / Oh my god / she showed me all the stars" sparked listeners questioning as to whom is being referred to. Soyeon responded that the imagery and lyrics represent love in many forms, and that she will leave it to the listener to interpret it their own way.

Promotion 
(G)I-dle had two versions of choreography, black (devil) and white (angel) to be performed on music shows. On April 9, the group performed the lead single for the first time on Mnet's M Countdown performing the black version, followed by performances on KBS' Music Bank for the white version, MBC's Show! Music Core, SBS Inkigayo, Arirang TV's Simply K-Pop, and SBS MTV's The Show.

On April 11, (G)I-dle held a special event, Oh My Call where 50 selected winners to participate the online fanmeeting. On April 25, the group held a comical prerecorded first solo concert, Safe House Concert through Hello82, with staff members were seen manually controlling strobe lights, rotating stage lights, making artificial stage fog with a diffuser and tossing confetti.

(G)I-dle performed the single on 32nd Korea PD Awards which aired on April 29, 2020.

On June 23, 2020, the group performed the single on KCON:TACT 2020 Summer.  They also performed it on KBS Music Bank's Mid-Year Special: "Music Bank Cinema" on June 26.

Critical reception
Karina Macias from Wild949 stated the song dives into various genres from Bollywood, pop, and trap and praising the group's soft and fierce looks in the music video. Crystal Bell of MTV described it as a "dark, trap-infused song with lyrics that riff on contrasts — light and dark, purity and sin — to communicate the idea that true divinity comes from knowing and trusting yourself." Kim Do-heon of IZM describes the track "convincing both fun listening and watching" as it crosses the Latin pop beat of "Senorita" and the heavy sound of 808 bass.

Music critic Yang Sora placed the song at number 15 in 2020 K-Pop Settlement list. In her review, she commented, "(G)I-dle's growth has been impressive in 2020. It starts from a verse with simple piano riffs and an 808 base to a pre-chorus beating through with a strong rhythm, and to the chorus that makes the atmosphere unique with (G)I-dle's dreamy melody and heavy base. [...] 
Jeon So-yeon's producing continues to show high quality and the vocal skills of the members who successfully expresses what Soyeon creates and excel in their assigned roles. In particular, Minnie and Yuqi's vocals, which captivated the dreamy atmosphere before, and Miyeon and Soyeon's singing, which took charge of the attractive moments of the song, stand out. While Soojin and Shuhua, which was able to give smooth connections, also clearly shows the attractive points of the song. [...] "Oh My God" is a song in which all the members' competencies are prominent at the same time, the unique colours of (G)I-dle shine once again."

Commercial performance
"Oh My God" debuted in the top eight major realtime music charts, including number one on three music charts, Bugs, Genie and Naver, making it their second time to top music charts since "Hann" in 2018. It has also debuted at number 97 in Scotland and at number 24 in Hungary, marking it their first ever appearance on European chart. The single also charted at number 1 on NetEase Music's daily popularity chart, new song chart and weekly K-Pop chart since its release. "Oh My God" debuted at number 13 on the KKBOX Hong Kong Korean single weekly chart, and peaked at number 2 for week 16 of 2020. In Taiwan, the song debuted at number 21 and peaked at number 3 on KKBOX Taiwan Korean weekly chart.

On April 17, 2020, they won their first public broadcast win on KBS's Music Bank. The group went on to win three additional award on SBS's Inkigayo, Mnet's M Countdown, and MBC's Show! Music Core, marking (G)I-dle's first grand slam music show win since debut.

According to Amazer, "Oh my god" topped number one most covered K-Pop song for the month of April.

Music video
Prior to its release, the song was accompanied by a music video teaser released midnight KST on April 6, 2020. The teaser exceeded 1 million views on YouTube in 11 hours.

The music video opens with a solo dance by leader Soyeon in a white room which leads her to escape the reality and gradually spread into a dream. It contains dark visual elements such as scene that portrays confusion in ego with whole body soaked in purple liquid and red mud, black coloured body painting and pouring red liquid over ones face. Towards the end of the video, Soojin whispers "Ab imo pectore" meaning 'from the bottom of my heart' or 'with deepest affection' in Latin.

Choreography for the song was created by Star System while being directed by director Yoon Rima and Jang Dongju of Rigend Film production team. The assistant directors were Lee Yongoh, Kim Eunah, Lee Sunhyu, Choi Eunjeong and Koo Eunji. Other key personnel were production assistant Choi Seongjin, Park Sangcheol and Il Joo while the Character Generator was Kim Eunah, Lee Sunhyu, Choi Eunjeong and Koo Eunji, Kim Bo-hyeong, Lee Yerim and Bae Haeun. The Director of Photography were Yun Inmo (ATOD), Park Junhee as the Gaffer and Shin Gwiock (A:WE) as the Art Director.

A monotone lyric video for the song was released on April 8.

A dance practice video for "Oh My God" was released on April 12.

On April 20, a special choreography video of "Oh My God" Heaven's version was released, showing their different charm as a gift for their fans for achieving 50 million views.

Reception
Mia Nazarena of Billboard was positive in an article about the album, praising the "dramatic scenes with visually stunning sets, finely-tuned choreography, and carefully curated costume changes".

On April 7, 2020, it was announced that the music video amassed 17 million views within 24 hours of release. The video broke (G)I-dle's personal record set in 2019 with the "Lion" music video, which garnered 5 million views in two days of its release. The music video debuted at number 8 on the Global YouTube Music Videos Chart dated April 3–9 with 15.6 million views. On April 13, the music video hit 50 million views on YouTube, becoming the group's fastest music video to reach this milestone.

On July 9, 2020, "Oh my god" music video reached 100 million views, three months after its released.

Plagiarism accusation 
After the release of (G)I-dle's music video teaser, viewers pointed out that several scenes of the "Oh My God" teaser video are similar in appearance and colour to British pop singer FKA Twigs released song "Cellophane" music video, which was released in 2019. Netizens pointed out the scene of an artist in mud or dark textured land appearing in the second half of the song. This scene represents the idea of birth or resurrection when Minnie said: "I am no longer a prisoner". The netizens also mentioned the scene of an artists falling among the cloths flying in the air. Lee Jin-jin of Kyunghyang Newspaper responded to the reports, stating that "(G)I-dle's music video was filmed in a series of scenes expressing various surreal situations. On the other hand, FKA Twig's music video has a specific story of 'Crash' and 'Emergency' as the main character falls into an unknown world among pole dances, and the content and settings themselves are different." Soon afterwards, the controversy attracted the attention of FKA Twigs' fans causing the group's foreign fans to disproof and plunge into plagiarism claims, and continuing the arguments in overseas social networking services than domestic. A representative from Cube Entertainment responded, "We have not yet grasped the exact situation. I'm going to find out more and resolve it.

Accolades

Charts

Weekly charts

Monthly charts

Year-end chart

Sales

Release history

See also
 List of K-pop songs on the Billboard charts
 List of Inkigayo Chart winners (2020)
 List of M Countdown Chart winners (2020)

References

External links

(G)I-dle songs
2020 singles
2020 songs
Cube Entertainment singles
Korean-language songs
Republic Records singles
Songs written by Jeon So-yeon
Music video controversies